Cataloochee Ski Area is a ski area in the eastern United States in southwestern North Carolina, near Maggie Valley. With  eighteen ski slopes and trails, approximately 44% are rated beginner, 39% intermediate, and 17% advanced. The slopes are accessed by three chairlifts and two carpet lifts.

Typical of North Carolina ski areas, Cataloochee relies primarily on snowmaking for its slopes. Cataloochee is known for having one of the longest seasons in the southeast, and in 2008 it opened October 28.  The average ski season lasts 125 days.

Maps
Trail Map.

External links

Online 30 minute GoSmoky.com radio show episode on Cataloochee Ski Area

Tourist attractions in Haywood County, North Carolina
Ski areas and resorts in North Carolina